Thecaphora solani, potato smut, is a fungal plant pathogen. It affects plants, primarily potatoes, in the Andean part of South America. The disease of potatoes that it causes is economically important (there have been reports of crop losses up to 80 percent in South America).

References

External links 
 Index Fungorum
 USDA ARS Fungal Database
  Pictures
  Information

Fungal plant pathogens and diseases
Fungi of South America
Ustilaginomycotina
Fungi described in 1944